Hirasea sinuosa is a species of small air-breathing land snail, a terrestrial pulmonate gastropod mollusk in the family Endodontidae.

This is an endangered species.
The width of the shell is 6 mm. The height of the shell is 3 mm.

Distribution
This species (and indeed the whole genus) is endemic to Japan.

References

 原色日本陸産貝類図鑑 (保育社の原色図鑑 (61))

Molluscs of Japan
Endodontidae
Gastropods described in 1902
Taxonomy articles created by Polbot